Lasioglossum floridanum is a species of sweat bee in the family Halictidae.

References

Further reading

External links

 

floridanum
Insects described in 1892